Askana is a village in the Ozurgeti Municipality of Guria in western Georgia with the population of 424 (2014). It i

References

External links

Populated places in Ozurgeti Municipality